Hennie de Romijn (born 23 February 1968) is a Dutch former footballer, who played as a left back.

Club career
De Romijn's first season of professional football, with Willem II during 1988–89, was in the Dutch Eredivisie. He subsequently played in the second division for nine seasons, representing Excelsior, NEC, FC Den Haag and Dordrecht'90 along the way. In 1998, De Romijn returned to NEC and to the Eredivisie, retiring three years later.

References

1968 births
Living people
Footballers from Leiden
Dutch footballers
Association football defenders
Willem II (football club) players
Excelsior Rotterdam players
NEC Nijmegen players
ADO Den Haag players
FC Dordrecht players
Eredivisie players
Eerste Divisie players